Church of the Holy Spirit, Vilnius might refer to:

 Orthodox Church of the Holy Spirit, Vilnius
 Roman Catholic Church of the Holy Spirit, Vilnius